Gabriel Cristian Iancu (born 15 April 1994) is a Romanian professional footballer who plays as a forward or an attacking midfielder for Liga I club Hermannstadt, on loan from Russian Premier League club Akhmat Grozny.

Iancu began his senior career at Viitorul Constanța in 2011, and at age 18 returned to FCSB where he was previously a junior. He won six trophies with the latter, but has since had multiple brief spells since leaving the capital in 2015. On his second stint at Viitorul, Iancu aided to a league title in the 2016–17 season, and on his third netted 18 times to become the top scorer of the 2019–20 Liga I. He has competed professionally in three countries apart from his own, namely Turkey, Poland and Russia.

Internationally, Iancu represented the Romania national team at several youth levels including the under-21 side, before going on to record his debut for the seniors in 2020.

Club career

Viitorul Constanța
Iancu made his senior debut for Viitorul Constanța on 1 September 2011, in a 2–0 Liga II home win over Callatis Mangalia. In March 2012, he and his Viitorul teammate Bogdan Țîru were on trial at Ajax, and he was also linked with a move to Galatasaray.

Iancu's first goal also came in a match against Callatis Mangalia, scoring the last of his team in a 5–1 away thrashing on 21 April 2012. By the end of the season which ended in promotion to the Liga I, he totalled five goals in twelve appearances.

Steaua București
Iancu continued his goalscoring run by netting six times from 18 games in the first half of the 2012–13 Liga I, which inspired a move to his former boyhood club FC Steaua București in the winter transfer window. The eventual champions acquired 70% of his economic rights for a rumoured €500,000 fee, and his five-year contract included a €25 million buyout clause.

On 30 July 2013, Iancu scored the goals of a 2–0 away victory over Georgian side Dinamo Tbilisi, facilitating Steaua's progression to the UEFA Champions League play-off round. He played two matches in the group stage of the latter competition, as Steaua finished last behind Chelsea, Schalke 04 and Basel, respectively.

Iancu did not impose himself at the Bucharest-based club and in the 2015–16 campaign was sent out on loan to Karabükspor in Turkey, where he only scored once in four games.

Return to Viitorul Constanța
In the summer of 2016, Iancu rejoined Viitorul Constanța as a free agent. On 13 May 2017, he converted a penalty in a 1–0 defeat of CFR Cluj, which earned Viitorul its first national title.

Termalica Nieciecza
In September 2017, Iancu joined Polish club Termalica Nieciecza on a two-year deal. Two weeks later, he made his Ekstraklasa debut by coming on as a substitute and scoring the winner in a 2–1 victory against Lechia Gdańsk.

Return to Romania
Iancu returned to Romania for the 2018–19 season, playing in quick succession for Voluntari and Dunărea Călărași before being once again re-signed by Viitorul Constanța in June 2019. He managed to become top scorer of the 2019–20 Liga I by netting 18 goals from 28 appearances.

Akhmat Grozny
Iancu earned a €500,000 transfer to Akhmat Grozny on 13 January 2021, signing a three-and-a-half-year contract with the Russian Premier League club.

On 3 February 2022, Iancu returned for a third time to Viitorul, now renamed Farul Constanța, on loan for the remainder of the season.

On 20 July 2022, Iancu signed for FC U Craiova after his loan at Farul expired.

On 13 February 2023, Iancu joined Hermannstadt until the end of the 2022–23 season.

International career
On 7 September 2020, Iancu made his debut for the Romania national team by coming on for injured Ciprian Deac in the 40th minute of a 3–2 away win over Austria in the UEFA Nations League.

Personal life
Iancu has been married since 2019, with the couple having one son who was born the following year.

Career statistics

Club

International

Honours
Steaua București
Liga I: 2012–13, 2013–14, 2014–15
Cupa României: 2014–15; runner-up: 2013–14
Cupa Ligii: 2014–15
Supercupa României: 2013

Viitorul Constanța
Liga I: 2016–17
Supercupa României: 2019

Individual
Liga I top scorer: 2019–20
Liga I Team of the Season: 2019–20

References

External links

1994 births
Footballers from Bucharest
Living people
Romanian footballers
Romania international footballers
Romania under-21 international footballers
Romania youth international footballers
Association football forwards
Association football midfielders
Liga I players
FC Viitorul Constanța players
FC Steaua București players
FC Voluntari players
FC Dunărea Călărași players
TFF First League players
Kardemir Karabükspor footballers
Ekstraklasa players
Bruk-Bet Termalica Nieciecza players
Russian Premier League players
FC Akhmat Grozny players
FCV Farul Constanța players
FC U Craiova 1948 players
FC Hermannstadt players
Romanian expatriate footballers
Expatriate footballers in Turkey
Expatriate footballers in Poland
Expatriate footballers in Russia
Romanian expatriate sportspeople in Turkey
Romanian expatriate sportspeople in Poland
Romanian expatriate sportspeople in Russia